Norway in Revolt is a 1941 American short documentary film that was an episode in the newsreel series The March of Time.  It was nominated for an Academy Award for Best Documentary Short.

See also
Fighting Norway, a 1943 Canadian newsreel short

References

External links

1941 films
1941 short films
1940s short documentary films
Black-and-white documentary films
American black-and-white films
American short documentary films
The March of Time films
RKO Pictures short films
Military history of Norway during World War II
Norway in World War II
1940s English-language films
1940s American films